The 2008–09 season was Port Vale's 97th season of football in the English Football League, and first season in League Two, following their relegation from League One. After a poor start to the season manager Lee Sinnott was sacked in September, and was replaced by Dean Glover. Despite a brief period of improvement, Vale then slipped back down the table to finish in eighteenth place. The team were also poor in the cup competitions, exiting the FA Cup at the Second Round, and both the League Cup and the League Trophy at the First Round. Marc Richards was the club's top scorer with eleven goals, and goalkeeper Joe Anyon was Player of the Year despite breaking his leg towards the end of the season.

Overview

League Two
The pre-season saw manager Lee Sinnott sign non-league midfielder Rob Taylor, former Hereford United defender John McCombe, and former Middlesbrough midfielder Steve Thompson. Both players cited Sinnott as their reason for joining the club. He also added experienced defender Sam Stockley (Wycombe Wanderers); midfielder Anthony Griffith (Doncaster Rovers); and attacking midfielder Louis Dodds (Leicester City) to the squad. Lee Collins also joined on an extended loan from Wolverhampton Wanderers, and would sign a permanent contract with the club in January. Stockley was appointed captain, and most of these players would become key for the club over the next few seasons. Just before the season's start, teenage Tom Taiwo also arrived on a month loan from Chelsea, as did Plymouth Argyle youngster Damien McCrory. The club was aiming for an immediate return to League One, and fans got behind the club with record high season ticket sales of over 6,000.

The season started well in August, but all four league games in September ended in defeat. However Sinnott refused to compromise his managerial philosophy in order to pick up results. A 4–1 home defeat to Macclesfield Town on 20 September would prove to be Sinnott's last game in charge. Sinnott was sacked on 22 September, with the Valiants in 16th place, Dean Glover taking over as caretaker manager for the second time in twelve months. The players were against the decision to axe Sinnott. Sinnott would later take court action against the club for a breach of contract, and settle out of court. Glover was appointed as manager on a permanent basis on 6 October. A win at Shrewsbury Town instigated a run of four away wins out of five. However Vale soon returned to their poor form, and slid back down the table. At the end of October, former Vale star Dave Brammer joined on loan from Millwall, and would join permanently in the January transfer window. The next month Scott Brown also arrived on loan from Cheltenham Town, and would also join on a permanent transfer two months later. This is also what happened with defender Gareth Owen, who arrived after leaving Stockport County following a bust-up with Jim Gannon. Notts County player Neil MacKenzie also joined on loan, but would not enjoy his short stay in Stoke-on-Trent. Attempts to bring back Chris Birchall on loan failed. Leaving Burslem was Chris Slater, who returned to former club Chasetown. In December, Andy Porter left the club's backroom staff after seventeen years at the club, highlighting the unrest in the camp. Both Porter and Mark Grew had turned down offers to become Glover's assistant.

In January, striker Luke Rodgers was released from his contract after a bust-up with manager Dean Glover, and immediately signed with Yeovil Town. Shane Tudor retired due to injury on 21 January. As well as the permanent signings of a number of loan players, Glover also brought in Pakistan international Adnan Ahmed on loan from Tranmere Rovers. Glover stated the club's revised aim was a top-half finish. In February, Glover signed Carlisle United striker Kevin Gall on loan. He failed to score in seven games with the club, and returned to Carlisle after picking up a calf injury. In March, Kyle Perry was allowed to join local non-league side Northwich Victoria, after being told he had no future at Vale. In his place came loanee winger Paul Marshall from Manchester City. On 23 March, Anyon broke his leg at Saltergate in a defeat to Chesterfield. With Vale going eight games without a win, Glover admitted he was 'a dead man walking', and implored the fan's not to boo his son. Fans protested against both the board and the manager. The final game was a 2–1 win over Barnet at the Underhill Stadium.

They finished in eighteenth place with 48 points, 21 points short of the play-offs, and eleven points clear of relegation. Only Accrington Stanley and Chester City scored fewer than Vale's tally of 44 goals. With fourteen defeats only Macclesfield Town and Chester lost more games than Vale. Had Bournemouth and Luton Town not faced point deductions then Vale would have finished in twentieth place. Marc Richards was the club's top scorer with eleven goals in all competitions, whilst Louis Dodds also contributed ten goals.

At the end of the season most of the playing staff were retained, though Scott Brown returned to Cheltenham Town, Kyle Perry was released and signed with Mansfield Town, and Dave Brammer had to retire after Chairman Bill Bratt informed him via voicemail that he would not be offered a new contract. Youth team graduate Paul Dixon was not offered a new contract. Dean Glover, unpopular with the fans, was also informed that he would not be retained as manager for the following season, and left the club permanently after he rejected the opportunity to remain as a youth coach. A slow uptake of season ticket sales was one major factor in Glover's sacking. Following Glover's departure the club withdrew their contract offer to Paul Edwards, who went on to play for Barrow. However Player of the Year Joe Anyon stayed at the club, despite claiming other clubs were interested in his signature.

Finances
On the financial side, poor results encouraged Vale fans to organize protests against manager Glover and the board, including Chairman Bill Bratt. With talks of fresh investment from shirt sponsors Harlequin Property came rumours on the internet that the company were planning to demolish Vale Park and build a supermarket, paying off Bratt to ensure his compliance. Bratt passionately denied these accusations, seemingly angered by the suggestion and claimed that if he were to comply with the protesters demands and remove himself and the rest of the V-2001 directors from the Board, then the club would fold as banks and creditors would seek their money. He also reiterated his prior statements by stating that he would be prepared to leave his position if the right offer were to be made. The club had to make monthly repayments of around £19,000 for a £2.25 million loan taken out from the local council in 2005. The club's shirt sponsorship came from Harlequin Property.

Cup competitions
In the FA Cup, Vale advanced past Huddersfield Town with a 4–3 win at the Galpharm Stadium, Dodds hitting a brace. They then were knocked out by Macclesfield Town at the Second Round stage with a 3–1 home defeat. This meant the Vale missed out on a lucrative home tie with Premier League side Everton. Keeper Anyon slammed his defenders for their part in the defeat.

In the League Cup, Vale were defeated 3–1 by Championship outfit Sheffield United at Bramall Lane.

In the League Trophy, Vale exited at the First Round with a 1–0 defeat to Stockport County at Edgeley Park.

League table

Results
Port Vale's score comes first

Football League Two

Results by matchday

Matches

FA Cup

League Cup

League Trophy

Player statistics

Appearances

Top scorers

Disciplinary record

Sourced from Soccerway.

Transfers

Transfers in

Transfers out

Loans in

Loans out

References
Specific

General
Soccerbase

Port Vale F.C. seasons
Port Vale